Stygioides is a genus of moths in the family Cossidae.

Species
 Stygioides aethiops (Staudinger, 1887)
 Stygioides colchica (Herrich-Schäffer, 1851)
 Stygioides ivinskisi Saldaitis et Yakovlev in Saldaitis, Yakovlev et Ivinskis, 2007 
 Stygioides nupponenorum Yakovlev et Saldaitis, 2011
 Stygioides persephone (Reisser, 1962)
 Stygioides psyche (Grum-Grshimailo, 1893)

Former species
 Stygioides tricolor

References

Natural History Museum Lepidoptera generic names catalog

Cossinae